Bone morphogenetic protein 3, also known as osteogenin, is a protein in humans that is encoded by the BMP3 gene.

The protein encoded by this gene is a member of the transforming growth factor beta superfamily. It, unlike other bone morphogenetic proteins (BMP's) inhibits the ability of other BMP's to induce bone and cartilage development. It is a disulfide-linked homodimer. It negatively regulates bone density. BMP3 is an antagonist to other BMP's in the differentiation of osteogenic progenitors.
It is highly expressed in fractured tissues.

Cancer 

BMP3 is hypermethylated in many cases of colorectal cancer (CRC) and hence along with other hypermethylated genes, may be used as a biomarker to detect early stage CRC.

References

External links

Further reading 

 
 
 
 
 
 
 
 
 
 
 

Bone morphogenetic protein
Developmental genes and proteins
TGFβ domain